The canton of La Pacaudière is a French former administrative division located in the department of Loire and the Rhone-Alpes region. It was disbanded following the French canton reorganisation which came into effect in March 2015. It consisted of 9 communes, which joined the canton of Renaison in 2015. It had 4,351 inhabitants (2012).

The canton comprised the following communes:

Changy
Le Crozet
La Pacaudière
Sail-les-Bains
Saint-Bonnet-des-Quarts
Saint-Forgeux-Lespinasse
Saint-Martin-d'Estréaux
Urbise
Vivans

See also
Cantons of the Loire department

References

Pacaudiere
2015 disestablishments in France
States and territories disestablished in 2015